The Intellectual Property Attache Act (IPAA) was unveiled by U.S. Representative Lamar S. Smith on July 9, 2012. This act was a section of the previously unsuccessful Stop Online Piracy Act (SOPA) which did not pass its markup by the House Judiciary Committee.
The bill's aim was to increase the presence of intellectual property attaches around the world. These attaches would play the role of intellectual property "diplomats" for the United States, encouraging other countries to enforce copyright laws. The attaches, currently linked to the US Patent and Trademark Office, would be set up in the Commerce Department.

References 

United States intellectual property law